Barnaby Bye was an American band formed in 1973. Peppy Castro, ex-Blues Magoos, formed Barnaby Bye with Long Island musicians the Alessi Brothers, Billy and Bobby, and Mike Ricciardella of The Illusion. They recorded for Ahmet Ertegun's Atlantic Records, and Ertegun personally produced their first LP.

Discography

Albums
1973: Room to Grow
1974: Touch
2008: Thrice Upon a Time

Singles
1973: "I Think I'm Gonna Like It" (P. Castro, K. Stuart Jr., B-side "Dreamer")
1975: "Blonde" (B. Alessi, M. Tilyou, B-side "Take Me with You")
Some of the recordings have been reissued by Wounded Bird Records.

References

American rock music groups